"Calling" is the first single released from Taproot's third studio album Blue-Sky Research.

Music video
The song's music video was directed by Moh Azima.

Charts

Personnel
 Stephen Richards – lead vocals, guitar
 Mike DeWolf – guitar
 Phil Lipscomb – bass
 Jarrod Montague – drums

Additional personnel
 Jonah Matranga – backing vocals

References

2005 singles
Atlantic Records singles
Taproot (band) songs
Songs written by Stephen Richards (musician)
2005 songs